Kenny Rivero (born 1981, Washington Heights, Manhattan, New York) is a Dominican-American visual artist who makes paintings, drawings, and sculptures that explore the complexity of identity through narrative images, collage and assemblage, language, and symbolism. Rivero is currently a Lecturer in Painting and Printmaking at the Yale School of Art and a Visiting Artist at The Cooper Union.

Early life and education 
Rivero was born to Dominican parents and raised in Washington Heights, Manhattan, NY. His Dominican-American identity and personal history is central to his work. 

He received a BFA from the School of Visual Arts (2006), New York, NY, and an MFA in Painting and Printmaking from Yale University School of Art, New Haven, CT (2012). He attended the Skowhegan School of Painting and Sculpture in 2017.

Work 
Rivero is primarily a painter, but also creates drawings, prints, and sculptures. His work engages the deeply personal. His paintings depict spaces and interactions between figures that appear fantastical, dangerous, foreboding, nostalgic, or tender. Figures in his work seem to be spirits, superhuman, or physical representations of psychological states. His paintings often include elements of assemblage, using objects of personal significance, often cherished mementos, or pieces of New York City, for instance, "Old cigarette packs salvaged from the Gramercy building where he worked as a doorman, dominoes fresh from a match: Each of his three-dimensional canvases are a layered “memory palette" [...].”

In an article for Hyperallergic, Benjamin Sutton describes the figures, symbolism, and mysticism in Rivero's painting titled Homage to the Three Three (PE NYK) (2015), "[it] has a ghostly head floating (or painted) on a brick wall. Around the corner flames shoot from a window, while a cluster of numbers apparently tagged on the wall tempt the viewer’s inner cryptographer. [...] Rivero’s piece is full of lovely painterly effects, from the thickening series of lines that make up the figure’s fan-like hair to the precise, Op art-ish grid of brick outlines. The painting is full of opaque symbolism." And in the Brooklyn Rail, Alex Jen describes It Happened on the Corner (2014), on view in Lure of the Dark At Mass MoCA in 2019, "a man lies sick on the ground as pairs of scuffed oxfords walk past. The sidewalk is painted to look like board game tiles. A smoke-stained sliver filled with monsters projects out of his belly like a magnified microscope illustration, and combusts at the bottom in a brilliantly painted fire so thick and crusted it looks whittled." Jen continues by describing the symbolism in another painting, Ask About Me (2017), "A nervous, coded pictograph of one's personal interiors, little crosses mark graves in the dark among pyramids, faceted gems, and empty cars."

Rivero's work aims to capture the supernatural elements of everyday, real experience, intertwining the ways in which reality seem surreal, especially when related to violence, pain, and grief. As described by Paul D'Agostino for L Magazine, Rivero's work, "is full of surprises that are not exactly stunning, terrors that aren’t really scary, notes of humor that aren’t necessarily funny, fantastical figments that are actually just real, and barely nightmarish murmurs that hum, also, in tones of just-awoken awareness, such that the dream is at once active and over. [...] A wonderful walk through the fanciful normalities and quotidian strangenesses of dreams—or of the blurred focus and liminal discomforts of what it looks and feels like to be dreaming. [...] the works lure you in while lulling you deeply into some cognitive elsewhere."

Exhibitions

Selected solo exhibitions 

 2018 - i see you with my eyes closed, Charles Moffett Gallery, NY, NY
 2018 - Don't Look For Me, The Delaware Contemporary, Wilmington, DE
 2017 - Hear, My Dear, Blackburn Gallery at the Elizabeth Foundation for the Arts, NY, NY 
 2016 - And I Will be the Same, Roswell Museum and Art Center, Roswell, NM

Selected group exhibitions 

 2018 - You Are Who I Think You Think You Are, American Medium, New York, NY
 2018 - The Lure of the Dark: Contemporary Painters Conjure the Night, MASS MoCA, North Adams, MA
 2018 - Black Pulp!, African American Museum Museum at USF, Tampa, FL
 2017 - Selections by Larry Ossei-Mensah, Elizabeth Dee Gallery, New York, NY
 2017 - Uptown Triennial: Nasty Women, Bad Hombres, El Museo del Barrio, New York, NY
 2017 - Spots, Dots, Pips, and Tiles: An Exhibition around the Game of Dominoes, Perez Art Museum, Miami, FL
 2017 - Black Pulp!, Zikha Gallery at Wesleyan University, Middletown, CT
 2017 - Black Pulp!, Contemporary Art Museum at USF, Tampa, FL
 2016 - Spots, Dots, Pips, and Tiles: An Exhibition around the Game of Dominoes, Hunter East Harlem Gallery, New York, NY
 2016 - Black Pulp!, Curated by William Villalongo and Mark Thomas Gibson, IPCNY, New York, NY
 2016 - Self Portraits, Bravin Lee Programs, New York, NY
 2015 - TXT: Art, Language, Media, Sugar Hill Children's Museum of Art & Storytelling, New York, NY
 2015 - The Fire Next Time, Galerìa Leyendecker, Tenerife, Islas Canarias, España
 2015 - Consequential Translations, Centro Cultural de España en Santo Domingo, Santo Domingo, Republica Dominicana
 2015 - Long Story Short, curated by Karin Bravin, Trestle Gallery, Brooklyn, NY
 2014 - Narratives of Self Exile/ Narativas del Auto Exilio, Curated by Miguel Luciano, Bronx Art Space, Bronx NY
 2013 - La Bienal: Here is Where We Jump, curated by Rocio Aranda-Alvarado and Raul Zamudio, El Museo del Barrio, New York, NY
 2012 - Eyes Off the Flag, Koki Arts and Motus Fort Gallery, Tokyo, Japan
 2011 - Bosch Young Talent Show, co-curated by William Villalongo, Stedelijk Museum, s-Hertogenbosch, Netherlands
 2009 - Octet, curated by Peter Hristoff and Susan Anker, Pera Museum, Istanbul, Turkey

Awards and residencies 
Rivero has been awarded a number of awards and residencies including, Joan Mitchell Foundation Painters and Sculptors Grant (2018), Skowhegan School of Painting and Sculpture (2017), The Fountainhead Residency (2016), Rema Hort Mann Foundation Emerging Artist Grant (2015), Roswell Artist in Residence Program (2015-16), Lower Manhattan Cultural Council Workspace Program (2014-2015), Robert Schoelkopf Memorial Travel Grant from Yale University (2011).

References

External links 
 Official website
 Gorky's Granddaughter Video Interview

1981 births
Living people
Dominican American
Yale School of Art alumni
Yale University faculty
People from New York City
Skowhegan School of Painting and Sculpture alumni
Hispanic and Latino American artists
Dominican American visual artists